Cool "Gator" (also released as Keep on a Blowin') is the second album led by saxophonist Willis Jackson featuring organist Jack McDuff and guitarist Bill Jennings which was recorded in 1959 and 1960 and released on the Prestige label.

Reception

Allmusic awarded the album 4½ stars calling it "Enjoyable and accessible music that swings and contains its share of soul".

Track listing 
 "Keep on a' Blowin'" (Willis Jackson, Jack McDuff) – 10:24  
 "How Deep Is the Ocean?" (Irving Berlin) – 4:04  
 "On the Sunny Side of the Street" (Dorothy Fields, Jimmy McHugh) – 3:30  
 "Blue Strollin'" (Jackson) – 7:45  
 "The Man I Love" (George Gershwin, Ira Gershwin) – 7:13  
 "A Smooth One" (Benny Goodman) – 5:24

Personnel 
Willis Jackson – tenor saxophone
Jack McDuff – organ
Bill Jennings – guitar
Milt Hinton (track 1), Wendell Marshall (tracks 3 & 4), Tommy Potter (tracks 2, 5 & 6) – bass
Alvin Johnson – drums
Buck Clarke – congas (track 1)

References 

Willis Jackson (saxophonist) albums
1960 albums
Prestige Records albums
Albums recorded at Van Gelder Studio
Albums produced by Esmond Edwards